Gwinn Henry (August 5, 1887 – May 16, 1955) was an American football player, track athlete, coach, and college athletics administrator. He served as the head football coach at Howard Payne University (1912–1913), the College of Emporia (1918–1922), the University of Missouri (1923–1931), the University of New Mexico (1934–1936), and the University of Kansas (1939–1942), compiling a career college football record of 100–78–16. Henry was also the head coach of the St. Louis Gunners, an independent professional football team, in 1933.

Coaching career

Howard Payne
Henry was the first head football coach at the Howard Payne University in Brownwood, Texas and he held that position for two seasons, from 1912 until 1913. His coaching record at Howard Payne was 5–7–3.

Missouri
Henry was head coach of the University of Missouri from 1923 to 1931. During his tenure, he compiled a 40–28–9 (.578) record. On December 25, 1924, he led Missouri against USC at the Los Angeles Christmas Festival, losing by a score of 20–7.

Other schools
Henry also coached at the University of Kansas, University of New Mexico, and the College of Emporia.

Late life and death
Henry moved to Albuquerque, New Mexico in 1943 and entered the real estate business. He died there on May 16, 1955 at the age of 67.

Family
Henry is the grandfather of collegiate track and field coach Pat Henry.

Head coaching record

College football

References

External links
 

1887 births
1955 deaths
American football ends
Basketball coaches from Texas
College of Emporia Fighting Presbies football coaches
Howard Payne Yellow Jackets football coaches
Howard Payne Yellow Jackets men's basketball coaches
Kansas Jayhawks athletic directors
Kansas Jayhawks football coaches
Missouri Tigers football coaches
New Mexico Lobos football coaches
Southwestern Pirates football players
St. Louis Gunners coaches
University of Missouri faculty
College men's track and field athletes in the United States
College track and field coaches in the United States
People from Concho County, Texas